Progress M-5 was a Soviet uncrewed cargo spacecraft which was launched in 1990 to resupply the Mir space station. The twenty-third of sixty four Progress spacecraft to visit Mir, it used the Progress-M 11F615A55 configuration, and had the serial number 206. It carried supplies including food, water and oxygen for the EO-7 crew aboard Mir, as well as equipment for conducting scientific research, and fuel for adjusting the station's orbit and performing manoeuvres. It was the first of ten Progress flights to carry a VBK-Raduga capsule, which was recovered after the flight.

Progress M-5 was launched at 10:37:42 GMT on 27 September 1990, atop a Soyuz-U2 carrier rocket flying from Site 1/5 at the Baikonur Cosmodrome. Following two days of free flight, it docked with the forward docking port of the core module at 12:26:50 GMT on 29 September.

Progress M-5 undocked from Mir at 06:15:46 GMT on 28 November, and was deorbited a few hours later at 10:24:28. It burned up in the atmosphere over the Pacific Ocean, with any remaining debris landing in the ocean. The Raduga capsule returned to Earth by parachute, and landed in Russia at 11:04:05 GMT.

See also

1990 in spaceflight
List of Progress flights
List of uncrewed spaceflights to Mir

References

1990 in the Soviet Union
Progress (spacecraft) missions
Spacecraft launched in 1990